David Grier Martin III (born October 21, 1968) is an American politician and attorney serving as a Democratic member of the North Carolina General Assembly, representing the state's 34th district. His district includes the northern part of Raleigh in Wake County.

Early life and education 
Born in Charlotte, North Carolina, Martin is the son of D. G. Martin, a lawyer, political candidate, and college administrator. Martin's grandfather, David Grier Martin, served as the 13th president of Davidson College.

Martin graduated from Davidson College and the University of North Carolina School of Law, where he served as a Note Editor of the North Carolina Law Review. He also has a LL.M degree in Military Law (International and Operational Law concentration) from the Judge Advocate General's School.

Career

Military service 
Martin is a lieutenant colonel in the United States Army Reserve and served in Afghanistan in 2002 and 2003. He is a graduate of the Army's Airborne School, Air Assault School, and the Field Artillery Officer Basic Course.

Politics 
Martin was first elected to the North Carolina House of Representatives in 2004, after defeating incumbent Republican Don Munford. Martin defeated Republican J.H. Ross in the November 2006 and 2008 elections, and Republican Steve Henion in 2010. He chose not to run for re-election in 2012 after redistricting placed him in the same district with fellow Democratic Rep. Deborah Ross. But in 2013, Ross resigned from the legislature, and with her endorsement, local Democrats selected Martin to take her place for the remainder of the term. He was unopposed for a full term in 2014, and was easily reelected in 2016, 2018, and 2020. Martin serves as the House Democratic Conference Co-Chair.

During his first tenure in the House, Martin at one point co-chaired the Transportation Subcommittee of the Appropriations Committee and chaired the Homeland Security, Military, and Veterans Affairs Committee.
He received the Disabled American Veterans of North Carolina "Legislator of the Year" award, the Pesticide Education Project (now Toxic Free NC) "Legislative Leadership" award, the National Guard Association of the United States' Charles Dick Medal of Merit, the Brain Injury of North Carolina's "Our Hero Award," and was named a "Freshman of the Year" by the Conservation Council of North Carolina. In 2010, Martin was named "Defender of the Environment" by the League of Conservation Voters of NC.

National and state Democrats recruited Martin to run for the United States Senate against incumbent Republican Elizabeth Dole in the 2008 election, but he declined in order to spend time with his family. In 2011, Martin was appointed by Secretary of Defense Leon Panetta to serve on the Reserve Forces Policy Board. Martin was named a 2014 Aspen Institute Rodel Fellow.

On June 2, 2022, Martin announced that he would be resigning his seat in the NC House to take a job at the Pentagon. Martin had been planning to run for re-election in 2022, but his name will be replaced on the general election ballot by another candidate chosen by the Wake County Democratic Party. His last day will be July 8.

Personal life 
Martin is married with one daughter.

References

External links
North Carolina General Assembly - Representative Grier Martin official NC House website
Project Vote Smart - Representative Grier Martin (NC) profile
Follow the Money - Grier Martin
2008 2006 2004 campaign contributions
Grier Martin official campaign site
News & Observer profile

|-

1968 births
Living people
Democratic Party members of the North Carolina House of Representatives
United States Army personnel of the War in Afghanistan (2001–2021)
Davidson College alumni
Politicians from Charlotte, North Carolina
Lawyers from Charlotte, North Carolina
21st-century American politicians
United States Army officers
United States Army reservists
The Judge Advocate General's Legal Center and School alumni